The Orlando Brice House is located in Eau Claire, Wisconsin.

History
Orlando Brice was an executive at a refrigerator company. The house was listed on the National Register of Historic Places in 1983 and on the State Register of Historic Places in 1989.

References

Houses on the National Register of Historic Places in Wisconsin
National Register of Historic Places in Eau Claire County, Wisconsin
Houses in Eau Claire, Wisconsin
Colonial Revival architecture in Wisconsin
Brick buildings and structures
Houses completed in 1918